Kadi Sarva Vishwavidyalaya (KSV) or Kadi Sarva University is a private university in Gandhinagar, Gujarat, India.

History
Sarva Vidyalaya Kelvani Mandal, Kadi (promoter of Kadi Sarva Vishwavidyalaya) was established in 1919.

Kadi Sarva Vishwavidyalaya is a university established vide Gujarat State Government Act 21 of 2007 in May 2007 and approved by UGC (ref f. 9-18/2008(cpp-1) 19 March 2009). The  university was set up by Sarva Vidyalaya Kelavani Mandal, a trust.

Academics
Kadi Sarva Vishwavidyalaya offers post-graduate courses in 25 disciplines like MBA, MCA, ME, M.Pharm. M.Sc. (Chemistry, Physics, Mathematics, Nursing, Bio-Technology, IT), M.Ed., M.A., etc.; graduation level courses in 17 disciplines viz. B.E., B.Pharm., BBA, BCA, B.Sc. (Chemistry, Mathematics, Bio-technology, Nursing, Physics), B.Voc. etc.; and diploma courses in seven disciplines. Kadi Sarva Vishwavidyalaya has become a pioneer in registering Doctoral students with 17 major disciplines like Management, Engineering, Pharmacy, Computer Science, Biotechnology, Mathematics, Physics, Chemistry, English, Psychology, Physical Education and many more. KSV offers M.Phil. courses in five disciplines ranging from computer science to English language.

References

External links
Official Website

Universities and colleges in Gujarat
Educational institutions established in 2007
2007 establishments in Gujarat
Buildings and structures in Gandhinagar